Châteaufort is a commune in the Yvelines department in Île-de-France in north-central France.

Châteaufort inhabitants are named Castelfortain.

The commune is named after the existence of three fortified castles during the Middle Ages; indeed, château fort means "fortified castle" in French.

On August 19, 1913, ahead of the Châteaufort aerodrome, the French aviator Adolphe Pégoud became the first man to jump from a plane using a parachute. The jump was made from a Blériot plane 200 m above the ground.

In the 20th century, Farman Aviation Works was headquartered in Châteaufort.

See also
Communes of the Yvelines department

References

Communes of Yvelines